Bonner House is a historic home located at Bath, Beaufort County, North Carolina.  It was built about 1835, and is a two-story frame dwelling with a one-story wing and rear shed addition. It sits on a brick pier foundation and has a side-hall plan. It is on land once owned by John Lawson (1674? – 1711), explorer and founder of Bath.

It is a contributing property in the NRHP-listed Bath Historic District, also known as Historic Bath, and is now an 1830s period historic house museum.  The mid-18th century period Palmer-Marsh House can also be toured.

It was listed on the National Register of Historic Places (NRHP) in 1970.

References

External links

 Bonner House: Historic Bath - North Carolina Historic Sites
 

Historic American Buildings Survey in North Carolina
Houses on the National Register of Historic Places in North Carolina
Houses completed in 1835
Museums in Beaufort County, North Carolina
Historic house museums in North Carolina
National Register of Historic Places in Beaufort County, North Carolina
Houses in Beaufort County, North Carolina
Historic district contributing properties in North Carolina